Rock, Rock, Rock! is the soundtrack album to the motion picture of the same name and was the first LP ever released by Chess Records labeled LP 1425 and Chuck Berry's first appearance on a long player. Only four songs from the album ("Over and Over Again", "I Knew from the Start", "You Can't Catch Me", and "Would I Be Crying") actually appear in the film. Eight additional songs by Chuck Berry, the Moonglows, and the Flamingos make up the balance of the songs. Other artists who appeared in the film were not on the album. Rock, Rock, Rock! is regarded as the first rock and roll movie to have had a soundtrack album issued.

Track listing
 "I Knew from the Start" - The Moonglows
 "Would I Be Crying" - The Flamingos
 "Maybellene" - Chuck Berry
 "Sincerely" - The Moonglows
 "Thirty Days" - Chuck Berry
 "The Vow" - The Flamingos
 "You Can't Catch Me" - Chuck Berry
 "Over and Over Again" - The Moonglows
 "Roll Over Beethoven" - Chuck Berry
 "I'll Be Home" - The Flamingos
 "See Saw" - The Moonglows
 "A Kiss from Your Lips" - The Flamingos

The album was originally released as a promotional item to a handful of radio stations, with a different cover and eight additional songs.

50th Anniversary expanded bonus tracks
 "I'm Not a Juvenile Delinquent" - Frankie Lymon & the Teenagers
 "Rock & Roll Boogie" - Alan Freed & His Rock 'n Roll Orchestra
 "Lonesome Train (On a Lonesome Track)" - Johnny Burnette and the Rock and Roll Trio

Notes

External links
 A Collector's Guide to the Music of Chuck Berry

Chuck Berry albums
1956 soundtrack albums
1956 debut albums
Chess Records albums
Albums produced by Phil Chess
Albums produced by Leonard Chess
Musical film soundtracks